Marc Fennell is an Australian journalist, television presenter, radio personality and author. Fennell is the host of Mastermind, Stuff The British Stole and was co-anchor of The Feed.

Career

Film critic 
In 2002, Fennell was a winner of the first AFI Young Film Critics Competition. He then became the film critic and reporter for Sydney radio station FBi Radio from 2003–2006.

During this period Fennell was selected as one of four presenters of SBS's The Movie Show in mid-2004. Fennell remained with the show until June 2006, when the show went on hiatus, returning in a different format (and with a different team) in 2007.

Fennell covered cinema across the ABC Radio Network including ABC Local Radio and the national youth broadcaster triple j. He presented the weekly movie segment on the Network Ten morning program The Circle from 2010 until it was axed in August 2012. 

Fennell also regularly produced digital projects exploring cinema culture including Bollywood For Beginners: a series for SBS Television about the history of Bollywood. He also co-produced a web series about movie trailers, Coming Sooner, with Nick Hayden and Nicholas McDougall.

Fennell has written 2 books, That Movie Book and The Planet According to Movies both published by HarperCollins.

Hungry Beast 
Fennell presented and reported on Hungry Beast, aired on ABC1. He primarily covered digital media, popular culture, gaming and technology.  Fennell was one of nine members of the team to be selected by Denton to develop online content for Zapruder's Other Films. Prior to Hungry Beast Fennell had worked with another of the presenters, Dan Ilic, developing a YouTube parody of the Freeview launch as part of their live comedy show Massage My Medium at the 2009 Melbourne International Comedy Festival.

Technology journalism 
Fennell hosts the ABC's technology radio program Download This Show which examines the latest developments in social media, consumer electronics, digital politics, hacktivism and online privacy. The program airs on Radio National, ABC Local Radio Digital and throughout Asia Pacific on Radio Australia. Fennell has also regularly produced reports on technology for programs on ABC News 24 including News Exchange (ended), The Drum, Weekend Breakfast and the Technology Quarter (ended).

The Feed 
Marc Fennell anchored the SBS current affairs program The Feed from 2013 to its conclusion in 2022. In addition to his main role co-hosting, Fennell's prerecorded segments became a feature of the show, most notably his interviews with film and television stars. In 2020, Fennell won a Walkley Award for documenting the theft of museum specimens.

Podcasts 
In 2019 Fennell created It Burns, a podcast series covering the global race to grow the hottest pepper. In 2020 he produced Nut Jobs investigating $10 million worth of nuts stolen from California. Fennell also created the ABC and CBC podcast series Stuff The British Stole which has since spawned a television series airing in Australia and Canada.

Documentaries 
In 2021, Fennell presented Framed a 4-part SBS documentary into the theft of Picasso's painting The Weeping Woman. Fennell hosted the Australian version of The School That Tried to End Racism for the ABC. Fennell has reported around the world for the SBS foreign affairs programme Dateline.

Mastermind
In 2021, Fennell began hosting the Australian version of Mastermind, replacing Jennifer Byrne.

Personal life 
Fennell attended the University of Technology, Sydney, but left after eight weeks to join SBS. His mother, a school teacher, is Indian-Singaporean and his father, a photographer, is Irish.

He attended secondary school at Trinity Grammar School and later St George Christian School.

He is married and has two children.

References

External links
 
 Fennell on Triple J
 Download This Show programme page

1985 births
21st-century Australian male writers
21st-century Australian non-fiction writers
ABC radio (Australia) journalists and presenters
Anti-bullying activists
Australian anti-racism activists
Australian film critics
Australian film producers
Australian game show hosts
Australian human rights activists
Australian humorists
Australian journalists
Australian male non-fiction writers
Australian podcasters
Australian people of Indian descent
Australian people of Irish descent
Australian people of Singaporean descent
Australian radio presenters
Australian satirists
Australian YouTubers
FBi Radio presenters
Living people
Media critics
Social commentators
Triple J announcers
University of Technology Sydney alumni